Semenzato is a surname and may refer to:
Fabio Semenzato (born Treviso, 6 May 1986), Italian rugby union player who plays as a scrum-half for Benetton
Daniel Semenzato (born 11 January 1987), Italian footballer who plays for Bassano
José Carlos Semenzato (born 23 March 1968), Brazilian businessman and entrepreneur, founder and president of Microlins